"Come, all ye jolly tinner boys" is a traditional folk song associated with Cornwall that was written about 1807, when Napoleon Bonaparte made threats that would affect trade in Cornwall at the time of the invasion of Poland. The song contains the line Why forty thousand Cornish boys shall knawa the reason why.

According to Cornish historian Robert Morton Nance, it was possibly the inspiration for R. S. Hawker's "The Song of the Western Men" which was written in 1824 and contains a strikingly similar line: Here's twenty thousand Cornish men will know the reason why!

Lyrics

References

External links

The Reason Why article from Old Cornwall by Robert Morton Nance.

Cornish folk songs
Cornish patriotic songs